James Francis Wambogo Wapakhabulo (23 March 1945 – 27 March 2004) was a Ugandan politician who served as the Minister of Foreign Affairs of Uganda from 2001 to 2004.

Background
Wapakhabulo began his career studying law at the University of East Africa (now the University of Dar es Salaam). From the 1960s until its collapse in 1977, he worked as a clerk and legal draftsman with the Assembly of the East African Community. Later that year, he moved to Papua New Guinea, as first a senior legal draftsman and then a principal legal officer. He continued in this role until 1986.

Political career
Wapakhabulo became involved with the ruling National Resistance Movement. He then stood for Parliament, and between 1994 and 1995 was chairman of the Constituent Assembly. In 1996, he was promoted to Speaker of Parliament, a post he held until 1998. In 1998, he was appointed as the National Political Commissar in Uganda's no-party political system until 2001 when he became Second Deputy Prime Minister and Minister of Foreign Affairs. He held both these positions until his death.

During his time as foreign minister, he helped contain a conflict with Rwanda and soothed relations with the Democratic Republic of the Congo, Burundi, and Sudan. In 2001, Wapakhabulo threatened to sue an opposition MP, Wanjusi Wasieba, after Wasieba accused him of blocking his electoral nomination. After making the accusation, Wasieba claimed that he had received death threats and hired armed guards.

Several days before he died, Wapakhabulo wrote to President (and long-time friend) Yoweri Museveni, opposing the lifting of term limits outside those prescribed by the constitution. He died at his home in the neighborhood of Bugolobi in Kampala on 27 March 2004. He was laid to rest at Mafudu Village, Sironko District on Friday, 2 April 2004.

Wapakhabulo was liked by many on both sides of Ugandan politics. Upon hearing of his death, leading opposition MP Aggrey Awori stated that he was "the best speaker ever". He was a recipient of Uganda's Nalubaale Medal for civilian activists who had assisted during the guerrilla war. Upon his death, Vice President Gilbert Bukenya proposed that Parliament Avenue in Kampala be renamed Wapa Avenue in honor of Wapakhabulo.

In January 2005, President Museveni appointed Sam Kutesa, the Minister of State for Investment, to succeed Wapakhabulo as foreign minister.

See also
 List of speakers of the Parliament of Uganda
 Francis Butagira
 Edward Ssekandi
 Rebecca Kadaga

References

External links
Speakers of Parliament In Uganda Since 1962 

1945 births
2004 deaths
Foreign Ministers of Uganda
National Resistance Movement politicians
University of Dar es Salaam alumni
Speakers of the Parliament of Uganda
Law Development Centre alumni
20th-century Ugandan lawyers
People from Sironko District
People from Eastern Region, Uganda